Mississippi Highway 28 (MS 28) is a state highway in south-central Mississippi, United States, that runs east–west from U.S. Highway 84 (US 84) west of Laurel to US 61/MS 33 in Fayette.

MS 28 is a largely two-lane, paved road that travels east and west across central Mississippi. The route does have several dangerous intersections and sharp curves, the most notable being the intersection with MS 37 in Taylorsville and the intersection with MS 35 in Mize. The road is heavily traveled, and is a major corridor from Laurel to Jackson.

Route description

Both MS 28 and MS 33 begin in Jefferson County at an intersection with US 61 in Fayette, located at an intersection in a business district just west of downtown. They head south as a two-lane highway through the business district to junction with Main Street (Old US 61) before passing through neighborhoods, where MS 28 splits off and heads east. MS 28 leaves Fayette shortly thereafter and begins traveling through rural woodlands for several miles, where it has an intersection with Medgar Exers Boulevard (Old MS 28 through downtown Fayette), and passes through Union Church, where it has an intersection with MS 550. The highway then crosses into Copiah County at an intersection with MS 552 in the community of Pleasant Hill.

MS 28 has an intersection with MS 547 at Allen as it travels through a mix of farmland and wooded areas for several miles (passing through the community of Gallatin) to enter Hazlehurst at an interchange with I-55 (Exit 61), where it widens to a four-lane divided highway. The highway narrows to a undivided four lane as it bypasses downtown along its north side, passing near Lake Hazle, where it has an intersection with US 51 (Caldwell Drive) before narrowing down to two-lanes and passing through neighborhoods for several blocks. MS 28 now leaves the Hazlehurst city limits to have an intersection with E Whitworth Street (Old MS 28; connector to the western section of MS 472) before traveling through a mix of rural farmland and wooded areas for several miles, where it both crosses and follows Copiah Creek into Georgetown. At Georgetown, the highway has an intersection with MS 27 before crossing the Pearl River into Simpson County.

MS 28 heads east through farmland for several miles to have an intersection with MS 469, and crosses the Strong River, before passing through Pinola, where it has a short concurrency (overlap) with MS 43, as well as having a junction with the eastern section of MS 472.  The highway takes a southeastern turn for several miles, where it has an intersection with MS 13, before heading back northeast for a few miles to enter the Magee outskirts at an intersection with MS 545. It becomes concurrent with MS 541 and they enter the city limits proper just shortly before becoming concurrent with US 49. They head southeast through a business district as a four-lane divided highway, where MS 541 splits off into downtown along Main Avenue S, before MS 28 splits off as a two-lane along Pinola Drive. MS 28 has a short concurrency with MS 149 (Simpson Highway 149) through some neighborhoods on the southern outskirts of downtown before MS 28 leaves Magee heads eastward through rural farmland for the next several miles to cross into Smith County.

MS 28 travels just to the south of Shady Grove for a few miles before passing through the town of Mize, where the road crosses Oakohay Creek and shares a concurrency with MS 35 (Oak Street) for a little over a mile. The highway passes through more wooded areas for a few miles to travel through Wisner before entering the Taylorsville city limits and traveling through an industrial area. MS 28 now passes straight through the center of downtown along Mayfield Street and Front Street, where it has an extremely short (and quite dangerous) concurrency with MS 37 (Welcome Street/Pine Street). MS 28 leaves Taylorsville after passing through neighborhoods to cross the Leaf River and have an intersection with MS 531 before entering Jones County at the community of Summerland.

MS 28 turns southeast through a mix of farmland and woodlands for several miles to travel through the community of Gitano, where it has an intersection with MS 529, and the town of Soso, where it has intersections with both MS 533 and MS 29. The highway passes through more farmland before coming to an end at an intersection with US 84 in Calhoun, a small community on the western outskirts of Laurel.

History

What is now MS 28 originated back in 1932 as Mississippi Highway 20 (MS 20), but it was renumbered to 28 in 1960 to avoid confusion with soon to be built I-20, with some sections of that highway beginning construction in 1960.

Future

There have been some discussions among residents in communities along MS 28 concerning plans to completely four-lane MS 28 from its terminus with US 84 in Laurel to US 49 in Magee. The route already shares a  concurrency with US 49 in Magee, and some residents feel that a four-lane highway would better alleviate heavy truck traffic.

There have been no official plans from the Mississippi Department of Transportation (MDOT) to upgrade MS 28 to freeway standards. Residents opposed to the potential change claim that "four-laning" the Highway would also entail bypasses for several small towns along the route, stifling business opportunities.

However, MDOT does have some improvements scheduled for the dangerous intersection with MS 37 in Taylorsville. A $3,000,000 project for "various intersection improvements at MS 37/MS 28" is set to begin in 2018.

Major intersections

See also

References

External links

028
Transportation in Jefferson County, Mississippi
Transportation in Copiah County, Mississippi
Transportation in Simpson County, Mississippi
Transportation in Smith County, Mississippi
Transportation in Jones County, Mississippi